The Metropolitan Cathedral of San Fernando formerly Cathedral of Our Lady of the Assumption is a neo-classical church in the  City of San Fernando, in Pampanga Province of the Philippines.
It is the seat of the Archdiocese of San Fernando.

History
In 1755 the first structure of wood and thatch was built on this site by the Augustinian friars under the patronage of San Fernando III, King of Castile. Fray Sebastian Moreno, O.S.A. was its first cura parroco. On October 17, 1757, townsfolk petitioned the governor-general for exemptions from tribute to enable them to build the church and convent.

It was transferred to the care of secular priests in 1788. The construction of the present style church started during the same year under the supervision Fr. Manuel Canlas, its first secular cura parroco, and a committee composed of the principales of the town.  They were led by gobernadorcillo Bernabe Pamintuan. Construction was completed in 1808. The church was rededicated to the Assumption of Our Lady.

The church measures 70m. long, 13m. wide and 11m. high. The round majestic dome rising from the rotunda of the transept is reminiscent of the Baroque style with some Renaissance elements.

President Emilio F. Aguinaldo and his cabinet viewed the Philippine Revolutionary Army from the windows of the convento on October 9, 1898. On orders of Gen. Antonio Luna, the Philippine Revolutionary Army burned the church and convento on May 4, 1899.

20th century
The church was destroyed by fire again in 1939, and restored by Pampango Architect Fernando H. Ocampo in 1948.

In 1948 the church was elevated to Cathedral when it became the seat of the Diocese of San Fernando, canonically created by Pope Pius XII.

In 1975, the diocese was elevated by Pope Paul VI, to Archdiocese of San Fernando. Its first bishop was Monsignor Cesar Ma. Guerrero, D.D. He was followed by the Most Reverend Emilio A. Cinense, D.D., who became its first archbishop. He was succeeded by the Most Reverend Oscar V. Cruz, D.D. in 1978.  The third archbishop of San Fernando is the Most Reverend Paciano B. Aniceto, D.D. Pamp, and the current is Most Rev. Florentino Lavarias, D.D.

Rectors
Very Rev. Msgr. Prudencio David, VG                              1918–1952.
Very Rev. Msgr. Bartolome Zabala                                 1952–1958.
Very Rev. Msgr. Pedro Puno, VG                                   1958–1969.
Very Rev. Msgr. Diosdado Victorio, VG                            1969–1974.
Very Rev. Msgr. Serafin Ocampo                                   1974–1981.
Very Rev. Msgr. Jesus Galang                                     1981–1992.
Most Rev. Paciano Aniceto, D.D.                                  1992–1995.
Very Rev. Msgr. Eugenio Mercado, VF                              1995–2002.
Very Rev. Msgr. Cenovio Lumanog, VG                              2002–2007.
Very Rev. Msgr. Ricardo Jesus Serrano, SLD                       2007–2013.
Very Rev. Msgr. Eugenio Reyes, JCD, PA 2013–2018.
Rev. Fr. Ricarthy D. Macalino,                             2018–2019.
Rev. Fr. Marius Roque, 2019-2021.
Rev. Fr. Manuel C. Sta Maria, 2021–present.

Image gallery

References

San Fernando
Roman Catholic churches in Pampanga
Buildings and structures in San Fernando, Pampanga
National Historical Landmarks of the Philippines
Spanish Colonial architecture in the Philippines
Neoclassical church buildings in the Philippines
Churches in the Roman Catholic Archdiocese of San Fernando